Brian Mason is a Canadian politician.

Brian Mason may also refer to:

 Brian Mason (geochemist) (1917–2009), New Zealand geochemist, mineralogist and meteoriticist
 Brian Mason (ice hockey) (born 1950), Canadian ice hockey coach
 Brian Mason (American football), American football coach and player